Peter D. Bear is a former member of the Wisconsin State Assembly and Wisconsin State Senate.

Biography
Bear was born on September 18, 1952 in Boston, Massachusetts. He graduated from The Bronx High School of Science in New York City before graduating with a B.A. from the University of Wisconsin-Madison and attending the University of Wisconsin Law School.

Career
Bear was a Democratic member of the Assembly from 1977 to 1978. He was a member of the Senate from 1979 to 1980.

References

Politicians from Boston
Democratic Party Wisconsin state senators
University of Wisconsin–Madison alumni
University of Wisconsin Law School alumni
The Bronx High School of Science alumni
1952 births
Living people
Democratic Party members of the Wisconsin State Assembly